In mathematics, the local invariant cycle theorem was originally a conjecture of Griffiths  which states that, given a surjective proper map  from a Kähler manifold  to the unit disk that has maximal rank everywhere except over 0, each cohomology class on  is the restriction of some cohomology class on the entire  if the cohomology class is invariant under a circle action (monodromy action); in short,

is surjective. The conjecture was first proved by Clemens. The theorem is also a consequence of the BBD decomposition.

Deligne also proved the following.

is surjective, where  are the special and generic points and the homomorphism is the composition

See also 
Hodge theory

Notes

References 
 

Morrison, David R. The Clemens-Schmid exact sequence and applications, Topics in transcendental algebraic geometry (Princeton, N.J., 1981/1982), 101-119, Ann. of Math. Stud., 106, Princeton Univ. Press, Princeton, NJ, 1984. 

Mathematics